Wreckage is the debut full-length studio album by British DJ/producer Robert Howes a.k.a. Overseer. It was released on 26 August 2003 via Columbia Records. Most of its tracks have been featured in advertisements, films, video games, trailers and television shows.

Track listing 

Sample credits
Track 1 contains elements from "We'll Bring the House Down" by Slade
Track 4 contains elements from "In the Morning Time" by Tramaine
Track 5 contains elements from "Let Me Clear My Throat" by DJ Kool
Track 9 contains elements from "Just Kissed My Baby" by The Meters

Singles

Horndog 
The track "Horndog" was released as a single from this album. The song contains a sample from DJ Kool's Let Me Clear My Throat. Like much of Overseer's work, this track has been used for commercial purposes such as in the 2004 Mitsubishi Endeavor advertisement.

The track was also used for the Phoenix Suns player introduction video for the 2007–2008 season.

The track was also used in the trailer for the 2004 film Walking Tall.

The track was also used in the 2004 film Eurotrip.

Supermoves 
"Supermoves" was used in 2002 video game Twin Caliber by Rage Software for PlayStation 2 as the main menu theme. Page 20 of the game's manual also promotes his then new EP "Force Multiply" and briefly describes Overseer.

Used in Electronic Arts' 2003 video game Need for Speed: Underground.

A remixed version is featured on The Animatrix: The Album.

Personnel
Robert George Howes – producer, engineering, mixing, additional instrumentation, artwork
 Dave Creffield – producer, engineering, mixing, string arrangements
 Zak Speakerwheezel – vocals on Slayed and Stompbox
 Chris Live – vocals on Velocity Shift, Doomsday and Basstrap
 Nick Life – vocals on Horndog
 Sandra Pehrsson – vocals on Meteorology
Andrew Montgomery – vocals on Aquaplane
 Rachael Gray – vocals on Sparks
 Jakk Frost – rap on Never
 Vicky – vocals on Never
Ricky Wilson – mofo's on Never
 Brian Perkins – spoken word on Heligoland
 Ruth Boswell – cello on Meteorology, Never and Heligoland
 Rebekah Allan – violin on Meteorology, Never and Heligoland
 Alice Laing – violin on Never
 Emesto Estruch – violin on Meteorology and Heligoland
 Michael Whittaker – viola on Never
 Paul Jones – piano on Meteorology and Sparks
 Chris Blair – mastering
 Wally – artwork, photography
 Geoff Johnston – artwork
 Jill Strong – photography

Charts

References

External links

2003 albums
Rob Overseer albums
Columbia Records albums